Ljutomir of Serbia (also Lubomir) is a potentially mythological governor of Rascia during its annexation by the Byzantine Empire (sometime between 976–1043). His only mention is in the Chronicle of the Priest of Duklja, a dubious document dating to 1298–1300 (additions date to as late as 16th century), where it says he was "a Rascian Duke" who married a noblewoman of Bosnia; they had a daughter who married Dragomir of Doclea.

According to some, Ljutomir may be the same person as Ljutovid, the Byzantine strategos of Serbia and Hum.

References

Sources
Sisic, F. (ed.), Stephenson, P. (trans. 1998) Chronicle of the Priest of Duklja, Johannes Lucius (1666) De Regno Dalmatiæ et Croatiæ (Amsterdam), available at <http://homepage.mac.com/paulstephenson/trans/lpd.1.htm> (10 Jan 2007) (extract only), XL.
 

10th-century Serbian nobility
11th-century Serbian nobility